Barkura, also spelled as Borkura, is a census village in Nalbari district, Assam, India. As per the 2011 Census of India, Barkura has a total population of 3,516 including 1,827 males and 1,689 females with a literacy rate of 79.41%.

Barkura village has a markable history in the Assam Movement, where the movement participants tried to stop Abida Begum from filing her nomination for the Barpeta constituency.

References 

Villages in Nalbari district